The Lebanon women's national football team is the official women's national football team of the country of Lebanon. The team was established in 2005, and is controlled by the Lebanon Football Association (LFA), the governing body for football in Lebanon. Whilst the team has yet to qualify for the FIFA Women's World Cup or the AFC Women's Asian Cup, they have finished runners-up at the 2022 edition of the WAFF Women's Championship, and in third place at the 2007 and 2019 editions.

Lebanon played their first match in 2006 against Algeria in a 12–0 defeat at the Arab Women's Championship. However, their first qualification campaign took place eight years later, on the occasion of the 2014 Women's Asian Cup. While Lebanon ultimately failed to qualify for the final tournament, they won 12–1 against Kuwait on 9 June 2013 in their biggest win to date.

Colloquially called "the Lady Cedars", their home kit is predominately red and their away kit white, in reference to their national flag. From 2006 Lebanon's FIFA ranking has been relatively steady, with their best ranking being 92nd in December 2009 and their worst being 148th in September 2018.

History

2005–2018: Formation and first tournaments
Known as "the Lady Cedars", the Lebanon women's national team was formed in 2005 as one of the earliest women's national teams in the West Asian Football Federation. Their first match was a 12–0 defeat against Algeria at the 2006 Arab Women's Championship. They finished in last place after three games without having scored a single goal.

Their first WAFF Women's Championship campaign was in 2007; after two 3–0 losses, first against Jordan and then against Iran, Lebanon beat Syria 7–0 thanks to an Iman Chaito hat-trick, and finished in third place in the tournament. In their second WAFF Women's Championship in 2011 they were drawn with Iran, Syria and hosts the United Arab Emirates (UAE). After losing their first match against Iran 8–1, Lebanon won 1–0 against Syria. In their final match, against the UAE, Lebanon lost 5–0 and were knocked out of the competition.

Managed by Farid Nujaim, Lebanon took part in the qualification campaign for the 2014 AFC Women's Asian Cup. This was their first official qualification tournament, eight years from their inception. They were drawn with Jordan, Uzbekistan and Kuwait in their group. In their first match, they lost 5–0 against Jordan before being defeated by Uzbekistan 4–0. Already eliminated, Lebanon beat Kuwait 12–1 in a consolatory victory, ending their qualifying campaign with three points. 

Lebanon were drawn with Thailand, Chinese Taipei, Guam and Palestine in the 2018 Asian Cup qualification, to be played in the West Bank in Palestine. However, Lebanon withdrew as they refused to play on the grounds that "it legitimises Israel's occupation of the territory".

2019–present: Recent history

Coached by Wael Gharzeddine, Lebanon competed in the 2019 WAFF Women's Championship in January. They began their campaign with a slim 3–2 defeat to hosts Bahrain. In their second match, Lebanon's late goals in each half secured a 2–0 win over the UAE. They then suffered a 3–1 defeat to Jordan, before beating Palestine 3–0, finishing in third place.

In the 2021 Arab Women's Cup, played in August, Lebanon were drawn with Egypt, Tunisia and Sudan. Following a 0–0 to Tunisia, Lebanon's first-ever draw, they lost 4–0 to hosts Egypt. In their final group stage game, Lebanon beat Sudan 5–1, and finished third in their group with four points.

The team began the qualifiers for the 2022 AFC Women's Asian Cup in October 2021, losing 4–0 to Myanmar; a 1–0 win against the UAE, and a 3–0 win against Guam were not enough to qualify them to their first-ever Asian Cup, as Lebanon finished in second place and were eliminated.

Between August and September 2022, Lebanon took part in the 2022 WAFF Women's Championship in Jordan under coach Hagop Demirjian. After winning 3–0 against Palestine, Lebanon lost to hosts Jordan 2–1 before winning the last game against Syria 5–2. They finished runners-up in the WAFF Championship for the first time, with Lebanon's Lili Iskandar being voted best player of the tournament.

Results and fixtures

The following is a list of match results in the last 12 months, as well as any future matches that have been scheduled.

Legend

2022

2023

Players

Current squad
The following 23 players were called up for the 2022 WAFF Women's Championship.
Information correct as of 3 November 2022

Recent call-ups
The following footballers were part of a national selection in the past 12 months, but are not part of the current squad.

Player records

Most-capped players

. Highlighted names denote a player named to the national team in the past year.

Top scorers

. Highlighted names denote a player named to the national team in the past year.

Competitive record

FIFA Women's World Cup

Summer Olympics

AFC Women's Asian Cup

Arab Women's Cup

WAFF Women's Championship

Other tournaments

Records
As of 4 September 2022, the complete official match record of the Lebanese women's national team comprises 43 matches: 14 wins, 2 draws, and 27 losses. During these matches, the team scored 69 times and conceded 145 goals. Lebanon's highest winning margin is 11 goals, which has been achieved against Kuwait in 2013 (12–1).

FIFA rankings
Below is a chart of Lebanon's FIFA ranking from 2006 to the present. Following a drastic increase of 52 positions (from 144th in 2007 to 92nd in 2009, their best ranking to date), the country went through a steady decline (from 92nd in 2009 to 140th in 2021, with their lowest ranking at 148th in September 2018).

See also

 List of women's national association football teams
Lebanon women's national under-20 football team
Lebanon women's national under-17 football team
 Lebanese Women's Football League
 Lebanese football league system
 Women's football in Lebanon
 Football in Lebanon
 Sport in Lebanon

Footnotes

References

External links

  
 FIFA team profile
 AFC team profile
 WAFF team profile

َArabic women's national association football teams
 
Asian women's national association football teams
national